The Frank L. and Ida H. Chambers House, located in Eugene, Oregon, is listed on the National Register of Historic Places.

See also
 National Register of Historic Places listings in Lane County, Oregon

References

1891 establishments in Oregon
Houses completed in 1891
Houses on the National Register of Historic Places in Eugene, Oregon
Queen Anne architecture in Oregon
Stick-Eastlake architecture in Oregon